Melodies of Love is Bobby Vinton's twenty-fourth studio album and his first studio album for ABC Records. It was released in 1974.

The album was released in response to popular demand, following Vinton's million-selling single "My Melody of Love", his first single in two years, which proved a successful comeback and earned Vinton the nickname "the Polish Prince". After the song became a #3 hit on the Billboard Hot 100 and a #1 adult contemporary hit, the semi-eponymous album was released, reaching #16 on the Billboard Hot 200 list of popular albums and going gold.

"My Melody of Love" is the first track on the album and is the album's highest charting single. Cover versions include Olivia Newton-John's hit "I Honestly Love You", Alice Faye's "You'll Never Know" and Al Martino's "Here in My Heart". The fifth track, "Am I Losing You", is a reworking of the Italian song "Io ti darò di più" with a few English lyrics replacing some of the Italian lyrics.

Track listing

 "My Melody of Love" (Bobby Vinton, Henry Mayer) - 3:08
 "I Honestly Love You" (Peter Allen, Jeff Barry) - 3:25
 "You'll Never Know" (Mack Gordon, Harry Warren) - 2:40
 "Dick and Jane" (Dewayne Blackwell) - 3:15
 "Never Ending Song of Love" (Delaney Bramlett) - 2:57
 "Am I Losing You" (Bobby Vinton, Alberto Testa, Memo Remigi) - 3:00
 "The Most Beautiful Girl" (Norro Wilson, Billy Sherrill, Rory Michael Bourke) - 2:27
 "My Gypsy Love" (Bobby Vinton) - 3:12
 "I'll Be Loving You" (Bobby Vinton, Gene Allan) - 2:46
 "Here in My Heart" (Pat Genaro, Lou Levinson, Bill Borrelli) - 2:43
 "I Want to Spend My Life With You" (Larry Weiss, John Williams) - 3:07

Personnel
Al Capps - arranger
Mike Melvoin - arranger
Joe Reisman - arranger
Ernie Freeman - arranger
Jim "Dallas" Crouch - drums, vocals
Armin Steiner - engineer
Tommy Vicari - engineer
Michael Lietz - engineer
Ray Gerhart - engineer
John Wagner - engineer
Barry Keene - engineer
Tim Bryant - album design
Mia Beard - photography

Charts
Album - Billboard (North America)

Singles - Billboard (North America)

References 

1974 albums
Bobby Vinton albums
Albums arranged by Mike Melvoin
Albums arranged by Ernie Freeman
ABC Records albums